Methynodiol diacetate (developmental code name SC-19198), or metynodiol diacetate, also known as 11β-methyletynodiol diacetate, is a steroidal progestin of the 19-nortestosterone group which was patented in 1968 but was never marketed. It is the diacetate ester of metynodiol, which, similarly, was never marketed.

See also
 Etynodiol
 Etynodiol diacetate
 List of progestogen esters

References

Abandoned drugs
Acetate esters
Estranes
Progestogen esters
Progestogens
Ethynyl compounds